Maximiliano Felipe Montero Rodríguez (born August 27, 1988 in Montevideo, Uruguay) is a Uruguayan footballer currently playing for Envigado as a left back.

Teams
  Liverpool 2006–
  Tigre (loan) 2011–2012
  Cerro Largo (loan) 2013
  Envigado (loan) 2013–

External links
 Profile at BDFA
 

1988 births
Living people
Uruguayan footballers
Uruguayan expatriate footballers
Uruguayan Primera División players
Uruguayan Segunda División players
Argentine Primera División players
Categoría Primera A players
Liverpool F.C. (Montevideo) players
Club Atlético Tigre footballers
Cerro Largo F.C. players
Envigado F.C. players
Expatriate footballers in Argentina
Expatriate footballers in Colombia

Association football defenders